Frederic (Fred) T. Chong is an American computer scientist known for research in computer architecture, quantum computing, and computer security.

Born in New Brunswick, New Jersey, Chong received a BS in Electrical Engineering and Computer Science from MIT in 1990 and a PhD in Electrical Engineering and Computer Science from MIT in 1996, with Prof. Anant Agarwal as his thesis adviser.

Chong served in faculty positions at University of California, Davis and University of California, Santa Barbara before joining the University of Chicago faculty in 2015 as the Seymour Goodman Professor of Computer Architecture. He is the lead PI of EPiQC, an NSF Expeditions in Computing program on Quantum Computing. He is a Fellow of the IEEE.  

In 2020, Chong co-founded Super.tech and served as Chief Scientist for the quantum software company. In 2022, Super.tech was acquired by Infleqtion (formerly ColdQuanta), where Chong now serves as Chief Scientist for Quantum Software.

Awards
2019: Intel Outstanding Researcher Award.
2002: University of California, Davis Chancellor's Fellow. 
2013: Named an ACM Distinguished Member.
2023: Elevated to Fellow Member of the IEEE "for contributions to the field of quantum computer architecture, compilation and optimization".

References

External links
 University of Chicago: Frederic T. Chong, Department of Computer Science
 

Living people
American computer scientists
MIT School of Engineering alumni
People from New Brunswick, New Jersey
Year of birth missing (living people)